Pen-y-graig, also spelled Penygraig, is an area of Llanelli, in Carmarthenshire, Wales, bordering with Bynea, Llwynhendy, and Bryn all of which are in the Llanelli Rural district of Llanelli. Welsh is the main language of the area where most of the children either attend the Welsh school in Cwmcarnhywel -Ysgol Brynsierfel or the English School- Ysgol Y Bynea.

Llanelli Rural